Mianus may refer to:

Mianus River, in Westchester County, New York, and Fairfield County, Connecticut, U.S.
Mianus, Connecticut, a neighborhood in Greenwich, Connecticut, U.S.

See also